Colin Peake is a Namibian cricketer. He made his first-class cricket debut for Namibia against Western Province. on 6 October 2016. He made his Twenty20 (T20) debut for Namibia in the 2017 Desert T20 Challenge against the United Arab Emirates on 15 January 2017.

In August 2018, he was named in Namibia's squad for the 2018 Africa T20 Cup. In October 2018, he was named in Namibia's squad in the Southern sub region group for the 2018–19 ICC World Twenty20 Africa Qualifier tournament in Botswana.

References

External links

Living people
Year of birth missing (living people)
Namibian cricketers